Falsilunatia benthicola is a species of predatory sea snail, a marine gastropod mollusk in the family Naticidae, the moon snails.

Distribution

Description 
The maximum recorded shell length is 23 mm.

Habitat 
Minimum recorded depth is 3510 m. Maximum recorded depth is 3980 m.

References

 Torigoe K. & Inaba A. (2011) Revision on the classification of Recent Naticidae. Bulletin of the Nishinomiya Shell Museum 7: 133 + 15 pp., 4 pls

External links

Naticidae
Gastropods described in 1990